Igbo-Ora is a city  and the headquarters of Ibarapa Central, Oyo State, south-western Nigeria, situated  north of Lagos. In 2006 the population of the town was approximately 72,207 people. In 2017 the population is estimated to be around 278,514 people.

The town is the location of Oyo State College of Agriculture. The college has contributed significantly to the socio-economic and demographic development of the town. The Oyo state government has just approved a High Court of Justice. The federal government is also said to have approved the location of a police training college in the town.

Twins
The unusually large number of twin births in the region has earned the town the nickname Twin Capital of the World. This phenomenon of a large number of twin births is not unique to Igbo-Ora; it has also been observed in the town of Kodinji in India, and Cândido Godói in Brazil. In Igbo-Ora, research has suggested that the multiple births could be related to the eating habits of the women in the region. Though no direct relation between dietary intake and twin births has been proven, a research study carried out at the University of Lagos Teaching Hospital has suggested that a chemical found in Igbo-Ora women and the peelings of a widely consumed tuber (yams) could be responsible.

A possible explanation that the large number of twins being born here could simply be a matter of genetics.

History 

Obe Alade, a descendant of Alaafin of Oyo with his family migrated from Oyo town several centuries ago following a chieftaincy tussle and when he and his kinsmen lost the contest, (As usual in those days, once you lost any chieftaincy tussle, people tend to leave the town). While coming from Oyo town, Obe Alade and his kinsmen came with idols mainly Egungun and Alaale which they worshiped.

First Settlement

Obe Alade and his family first settled at a forest name after them, a forest of immigrant (Awon to sako wa lati Oyo). Igbo-Asako, about three kilometers away from the present-day Igbo-Ora market.

It was at Igbo-Asako that Obe Alade became the first Baale of Igbo-Ora (Now Olu of Igbo-ora) as usual for a founder, hence the appellation “Omo Igbo-Ora Lasako”. The scarcity of drinking water and mosquitoes’ bites drove out the Igbo-Ora people From Igbo-Asako forest.

Hence the appellation “Bi o ri emo ri, ki o nso ni Igbo-Ora Lasko, abongangan ibr ju esi ode lo, yanmuyanmu ibe ju ikamudu” meaning “If you want trouble, go to Igbo-Ora in Asako where mosquitoes are as big as hunter flies and bigger than other insects”.

Second Settlement

Due to unfavorable conditions, harsh weather and insect bites, they left Igbo-Asako. Igbo-Ora people now found another site called Igbo-Ayin near Ayin river and they settled there. They relied on this Ayin river for drinking water and other domestic purposes. There is a flat rock, and on that rock, they established a big market called “Apata Itaja” Market.

Third Settlement (Last Settlement)

The Igbo-Ora people left Igbo Ayin to find another forest which was in a marshy and swampy area (“Ira”) an unseasonal river called Igbo-Ira (Igbo inu Ira) and the present site. It is here the town derived its name when people refer to the people of the settlement as Omo Igbo-Ira later it was shortened as Igbo-Ora.

At each of the above settlements people name the town with a prefix of the forest:
Igbo-Asako
Igbo-Ayin
Igbo-Ora

This led to the appellation they gave to the people “Omo Igbo-Ora Lasako” in other to link them with their Original settlement.

Economy
The main economic activity in Igbo-Ora is farming. Obasanjo farms is one of the major mechanized farms and engages in poultry, cash crops and fishery. Subsistence agriculture and hunting are other economic activities practised there. Service-based industries include two banks, the Owotutu line of businesses and NITEL sub-station. Most salaried jobs revolve around teaching, local government employment and the few private businesses. The West-North Abeokuta-Sokoto highway, which pass through the town, serves as a potential link to economic prosperity.

Administration
Igbo-Ora is the Headquarters of Ibarapa Central local government, comprising Igbo-Ora and Idere. It has 7 wards, while Idere has 3. The community could not benefit from the recent initiative of the Oyo State Government to create additional council administrations (LCDA), since the community voted no to such initiative during the Local Council Referendum by the Lam Adeshina administration.

Traditional rulers 
Igboora is a collection of autonomous towns each with its traditional heads, but with a very porous land boundaries.  
The names of all the Oba & Baales in Igboora:

 Oba Jimoh Olajide Titiloye, Asoro-olu Ayinla V, Olu of Igboora Land.
 Jamiu Adedamola Badmus (JP) (JP), Ayeleso III, Olu-Aso of Iberekodo, Igbo-Ora
 (MSA) Joshua Olusanjo Ojo (JP), Lagbaaju IV, Baba-Aso of Iberekodo-Igbole, Igbo-Ora.
 (ALH) Jinadu Adekunle Fasasi (JP), Baabani IV, Onisagan-un of Sagan-un, Igbo-Ora.
 Samuel Adewuyi Adeleye (JP), Olaribigbe IV, Onidofin of Idofin, Igbo-Ora.
 Late Lamidi Olayide Akinyemi, Iwolafisagba III, Onipako of Pako, Igbo-Ora.
 Oba Mosun Oladokun, The Bansa of Ilusa-ile, Igbo-Ora.

Olu of Igbo-ora land

Ruling House/Family in Igbo-ora

The Asoro-Olu and Atanbala families are the only two families that can produce the Baale (Olu) of Igbo-ora, they have been in Igbo-Ile, Igbo-Ora as land owners and occupants in the third settlement, before Lajorun a ubiquitous hunter and an Oro worshiper came from Ikole-Ekiti to Abeokuta and from there to Fedegbo which after he settled down at Igbo-Ile,  Igbo-Ora. The Asoro-Olu family and Atanbala family have been ruling before the arrival of Lajorun from Fedegbo.

Olayemi Akano, the son of Oladibu Adio was then on the throne as Baale of Igbo-Ora when Lajorun came from Fedego and settle in Igbo-Ile.

It was at Igbo-Ile that Lajorun married Olupeti, the daughter of Ajade a settler at Igbo-Ile, Igbo-Ora. The marriage produced three children:
 Omoyele (female)
 Oroki (male) 
 Omoribisiyan (male)

Lajorun was never Baale of Igbo-Ora (Olu of Igbo-Ora) and its false and misleading to say he founded Igbo-Ora, when Igbo-Ora had already been in existence before his arrival and he only has a tint connection through Bankole Atanbala, his grandson who was mothered by his daughter Omoyele and fathered by Olayemi Akano the son of Oladibu Adio.

The Asoro-Olu family and Atanbala family are the only royal family in Igbo-Ora as contained in Justice Adenekan Ademola Chieftaincy review commission Report and the Government Decisions thereon in pages 56–58, 1976.

Asoro-Olu Ayinla ruling house have produced six Baales of Igb-Ora (Olu of Igbo-Ora Land) to the throne. They are:
 Obe Alade – The founder of Igbo-Ora Lasako (Asoro-Olu Ayinla ruling house)
 Asoro-Olu Ayinla (a.k.a. Arojojoye) (Asoro-Olu Ayinla ruling house)
 Erubami Ishola (Asoro-Olu Ayinla ruling house)
 Oyekannmi Ayinde (Asoro-Olu Ayinla ruling house)
 Adefemi Akanmu Erubami II (1932-1940) (Asoro-Olu Ayinla ruling house)
 Jimoh Olajide Titiloye (2019–current). (Asoro-Olu Ayinla ruling house)

Atanbala ruling house have produced seven Baales of Igb-Ora (Olu of Igbo-Ora Land) to the throne. They are:
 Oladibu Adio (Atanbala ruling house)
 Olayemi Akano (Atanbala ruling house)
 Bankole Otaobala (Atanbala ruling house)
 Ajayi Baale Agba (1870–1921, Atanbala ruling house)
 Ayerina Akande (1923–1931, Atanbala ruling house)
 Adeoye Alamo (1941–1975, Atanbala ruling house)
 Jacob Oyerogba (1975–2018, Atanbala ruling house)- Gbadewolu I, Olu of Igbo-Ora.

The order of the Their Reign as Baale (Olu) of Igbo-ora is:
 Obe Alade – The founder of Igbo-Ora Lasako (Asoro-Olu Ayinla ruling house) - Baale
 Oladibu Adio (Atanbala ruling house) - Baale
 Asoro-Olu Ayinla (a.k.a. Arojojoye, Asoro-Olu Ayinla ruling house) - Baale
 Olayemi Akano (Atanbala ruling house) - Baale
 Bankole Otaobala (Atanbala ruling house) - Baale
 Erubami Ishola (Asoro-Olu Ayinla ruling house) - Baale
 Oyekannmi Ayinde (Asoro-Olu Ayinla ruling house) - Baale
 Ajayi Baale Agba (1870–1921, Atanbala ruling house) - Baale
 Ayerina Akande (1923–1931, Atanbala ruling house) - Baale
 Adefemi Akanmu Erubami II (1932-1940, Asoro-Olu Ayinla ruling house) - Baale
 Adeoye Alamo (1941–1975, Atanbala ruling house) - Baale
 Jacob Oyerogba (1975–2018, Atanbala ruling house) - Gbadewolu I, Olu of Igbo-Ora
 Jimoh Olajide Titiloye (2019–current, Asoro-Olu Ayinla ruling House) Olu of Igbo-Ora.

Oba Jimoh Olajide, Titiloye (Asoorolu Ayinla V) 

Oba Jimoh Olajide, Titiloye was born August 4, 1961 to the family of Pa Titiloye Alliu Bamigbose of Asoro-Olu Ruling house, Oke Iserin, Igbo-Ora and Titilayo Ashiawu Agbeke of Olukosi compound of Iberekodo, Igbo-ora in Ibarapa Central Local government, Oyo State.

Family

OBA Jimoh can be said to have a very humble beginning, he is the first male child of his parents, enjoyed all the moral support, affection, dedication, spiritual support and sound up bringing by all family members. He is happily married and has two children; male and female of which Taiwo and Kehinde Titiloye are twins.

Education and Professional Qualifications

He started elementary education in Igbo-Ora where he attended Nawal-Ud-Deen Primary School, Igbo-Ora and Methodist Modern School, Igbo-Ora. He later proceeded to Government Technical College, Ayetoro and The Polytechnic, Ibadan, Esa-Oke Campus. He obtained a B.Sc degree in Industrial Technical Education from University of Nigeria, Nsukka and a Master of Business Administration with specialization in International Business Management from Lagos State University, Ojoo, Lagos. He is a member of Institute of purchasing and supply management of Nigeria and a technical consultant trained both locally and abroad.

Nomination

He was selected among princes that were also heir to the throne in November 2018.
He is best described as a distinct character dedicated to the peaceful co-existence of humans. He is God fearing.

Schools

Public 
 Igboora High School, Igbole. 
 Methodist Grammar School, Sagan-un
 Ogboja Grammar School, Pako
 Lajorun High School, Oke Iserin
 Lasogba High School, Idofin,.
 Igboora Grammar School, Isale Oba
 Iberekodo High School, Imeleke
 Igboora Secondary School

Private schools and colleges
 Adegoke College, Abolonko Area, Iberekodo
 Ansar-Ud-Deen Grammar School
 Nawair - Ud - Deen Grammar School 
 Kastad Schools
 Hopecrest College
 Royal College, Orile, Igbo-ora
 Favourland College, Pako

Post Secondary Institution
 Oyo State College of Agriculture and Technology

Notable people
Bisi Akin-Alabi, education expert, social worker, administrator, technocrat, education consultant

References

Populated places in Oyo State
Towns in Yorubaland
Populated places with highest incidence of multiple birth